Karo people may refer to:

Karo people (Indonesia)
Karo people (East Africa)
Karo people (Ethiopia)